Kushk (also Romanized as Kūshk; also known as Kooshk Korbal and Kūshk-e Korbāl) is a village in Sofla Rural District, in the Central District of Kharameh County, Fars Province, Iran. At the 2006 census, its population was 243, in 63 families.

References 

Populated places in Kharameh County